Hawthorn Woods is a village in Fremont and Ela townships in Lake County, Illinois, United States. Per the 2020 census, the population was 9,062. Hawthorn Woods was officially incorporated in 1958. Major transportation arteries include Midlothian Road, Old McHenry Road, Algonquin Road, Halfday Road, and the Elgin, Joliet and Eastern Railway. The new Hawthorn Woods Country Club, whose golf course was designed by golf professional Arnold Palmer, is located within the village's perimeter.

Geography
Hawthorn Woods is located at  (42.228306, -88.055319).

History 
Hawthorn Woods, previously inhabited by the Potawatomi tribe. After the famous Treaty of Chicago (1833) which brought thousands of Native Americans in the Midwest to cede their lands. Yankee farmers would later claim this land, the area became a popular destination for both German and Dutch immigrants. 

The Lake County Discovery Museum, Cuneo Museum & Gardens, and the Fort Hill Heritage Museum are all accessible in Hawthorn Woods.

Demographics

2020 census

Note: the US Census treats Hispanic/Latino as an ethnic category. This table excludes Latinos from the racial categories and assigns them to a separate category. Hispanics/Latinos can be of any race.

2010 Census
As of the census of 2010, there are 7,663 people, and 2,560 households in the village. The racial makeup of the village was 94.55% White, 0.07 African American, 0.02% Native American, 3.10% Asian, 0.07% Pacific Islander, 0.57% from other races, and 1.00% from two or more races. Hispanic or Latino of any race were 2.07% of the population.

There were 1,831 households, out of which 55.3% had children under the age of 18 living with them, 89.2% were married couples living together, 3.1% had a female householder with no husband present, and 6.7% were non-families. 4.2% of all households were made up of individuals, and 1.0% had someone living alone who was 65 years of age or older. The average household size was 3.28 and the average family size was 3.39.

In the village, the population was spread out, with 33.6% under the age of 18, 4.6% from 18 to 24, 28.3% from 25 to 44, 29.1% from 45 to 64, and 4.4% who were 65 years of age or older. The median age was 38 years. For every 100 females, there were 101.1 males. For every 100 females age 18 and over, there were 98.8 males.

The median income for a household in the village was $132,720, and the median income for a family was $134,034. Males had a median income of $100,000+ versus $55,156 for females. The per capita income for the village was $49,346. About 2.1% of families and 1.9% of the population were below the poverty line, including 1.4% of those under age 18 and 5.1% of those age 65 or over.

In terms of quality of living and overall goodness, Hawthorn Woods ranks #24 in the State of Illinois.

In 2022, Hawthorn Woods ranks no.#8 as the wealthiest towns in Illinois and no.#81 nationwide.

Notable people

 Dominick Basso, bookmaker for the Chicago Outfit. Basso lived in Hawthorn Woods from at least the 1980s until 1999.
 Leo Burnett (October 21, 1891 – June 7, 1971) was an American advertising executive and the founder of  Leo Burnett Company, Inc. He was responsible for creating some of advertising's most well-known characters and campaigns of the 20th century, including Tony the Tiger, the Marlboro Man, the Maytag Repairman, United's "Fly the Friendly Skies", and Allstate's "Good Hands", and for garnering relationships with multinational clients such as McDonald's, Hallmark and Coca-Cola. Burnett was a resident of Hawthorn Woods from approximately 1942, until his death, at his Hawthorn Woods family farm in 1971.
 Anthony Castonzo, offensive tackle for the Indianapolis Colts. He was raised in Hawthorn Woods.
 Nancy Faust, organist for the Chicago White Sox from 1970 until her retirement in 2010. She is a resident of Hawthorn Woods.
 Alex Young, American professional baseball pitcher. Was raised in Hawthorn Woods and attended nearby Carmel Catholic High School.

References

External links
Village of Hawthorn Woods official website

Villages in Illinois
Villages in Lake County, Illinois
Populated places established in 1958